Bogert's garter snake (Thamnophis bogerti) is a species of snake in the family Colubridae. The species is endemic to Mexico.

Etymology
Both the specific name bogerti and the common name Bogert's garter snake are in honor of the American herpetologist Charles Mitchill Bogert.

Geographic range
T. bogerti is found in the Mexican state of Oaxaca.

Habitat

Reproduction
T. bogerti is viviparous.

References

Further reading
Heimes, Peter (2016). Snakes of Mexico: Herpetofauna Mexicana Vol. I. Frankfurt, Germany: Chimaira. 572 pp. .
Mata-Silva, Vicente; Johnson, Jerry D.; Wilson, Larry David; García-Padilla, Elí (2015). "The herpetofauna of Oaxaca, Mexico: composition, physiographic distribution, and conservation status". Mesoamerican Herpetology 2 (1): 6-62.
Rossman, Douglas A.; Burbrink, Frank T. (2005). "Species limits within the Mexican garter snakes of the Thamnophis godmani complex". Occasional Papers of the Museum of Natural Science, Louisiana State University 79: 1-43. (Thamnophis bogerti, new species, pp. 22–25, Figures 8–9).

Reptiles described in 2005
Reptiles of Mexico
Thamnophis
IUCN Red List data deficient species
Taxa named by Douglas A. Rossman